Eye of the needle or eye of a needle is the  tunnel-like space near one end of a sewing needle.

Eye of the Needle also may refer to:

Text works 
 Biblical parable/metaphor of the camel and the eye of the needle

Books
 The Eye of the Needle – Towards Participatory Democracy in South Africa, (1973) by philosopher Rick Turner
 Eye of the Needle (novel), 1978 novel by Ken Follett

Film and television

Film
 The Eye of the Needle (film), 1963 film directed by Marcello Andreie
 Eye of the Needle (film), 1981 film directed by Richard Marquand, based on the novel by Ken Follett

Television
 "Eye of the Needle" (Star Trek: Voyager), the seventh episode of Star Trek: Voyager

Places

U.S.
 Eye of the Needle, a previous name of the SkyCity revolving restaurant in the Seattle Space Needle
 Eye of the Needle (Montana), a rock formation

Songs 
 "Eye of the Needle", a song on the 2001 album Regeneration (The Divine Comedy album)
 "Eye of the Needle", a song by Dilated Peoples on the 2004 album 20/20
 "Eye of the Needle", a song by The Datsuns on the 2008 album Headstunts 
 "Eye of the Needle" (song), 2014 song by Sia Furler

See also 

 Needle's Eye, an architectural folly in Wentworth, South Yorkshire